The men's team compound archery competition at the 2014 Asian Games in Incheon was held from 23 to 27 September at Gyeyang Asiad Archery Field.

A total of 14 teams participated in the qualification round with all 14 teams progressing to the knockout round.

Schedule
All times are Korea Standard Time (UTC+09:00)

Results 
Legend
DNS — Did not start

Ranking round

Knockout round

References

External links
Official website

Men's compound team